Pray for Morning is a 2006 horror/thriller movie directed and written by Cartney Wearn.

Plot 

In 1984, a group of five high schoolers had broken into an abandoned hotel, as was tradition after graduation. They were all gruesomely murdered.  At the insistence of one set of parents, the police brought in a psychic, as they could find no leads. The psychic said that the murderer was still in the hotel. The police searched but found no one. The psychic died in her sleep that night. The search was never continued, the murderer never found.

20 years later, six students had planned to enter the hotel. Two younger high school students found out that they were "up to something" and they "wanted in." The plan was, during the course of one night, to find all five rooms where the students were murdered. They find a severed hand in the first room and it unleashes a horrible curse. After the first two deaths, they find out that they need to find the other hand and the body and bury them together.

Cast List 

Udo Kier as Edouard Leopold Edu
Jonathon Trent as Jesse
Jessica Stroup as Ashley
Dennis Flanagan as Dylan
Ashlee Turner as Lilly
Jackson Rathbone as Connor
Brandon Novitsky as Topher
Kip Martain as Rand
Rachel Veltri as Bunny
Robert F. Lyons as William Proctor
Peter Pasco as Robert

Awards 

Pray for Morning won one award at the Moondance International Film Festival in 2007. It won the Columbine Award. It was in the Film Score category, and Vincent Gillioz won.

External links
 IMDb page
 

2006 films
American horror films
2006 horror films
2000s American films